Good Looking may refer to:
 Good Looking Records, record label of LTJ Bukem

See also
 Looking Good, an Australian television programme hosted by Deborah Hutton
 Beauty